Cissel may refer to:

Jewish rye bread, also called cissel bread
Chuck Cissel (born 1948), American entertainer
Lee Cissel (1932–1977), American football coach

See also
Dickcissel
Sisal
Sissel